James O'Meara (born 1955) is an Irish former hurler. At club level he played with Kilruane MacDonaghs and was also a member of the Tipperary senior hurling team.

Career

O'Meara first played hurling at juvenile and underage levels with the Kilruane MacDonaghs. After winning four consecutive Tipperary U21AHC titles, he spent 20 seasons as a member of the club's senior team and is one of only a handful of players to have won seven North Tipperary SHC titles between 1977 and 1990 when he captained the team. O'Meara was at centre-back when Kilruane MacDonaghs won the All-Ireland Club Championship title in 1986, having earlier won four Tipperary SHC titles.

O'Meara first appeared on the inter-county scene during a two-year tenure with the Tipperary minor hurling team. He also spent two seasons with the under-21 team, however, his underage career ended without success. O'Meara's performances at club level earned his inclusion on the senior team for the 1977 Munster SHC campaign.

Honours

Kilruane MacDonaghs
All-Ireland Senior Club Hurling Championship: 1986
Munster Senior Club Hurling Championship: 1985
Tipperary Senior Hurling Championship: 1977, 1978, 1979, 1985 (c)
North Tipperary Senior Hurling Championship: 1977, 1978, 1979, 1985, 1986, 1987, 1990 (c)
Tipperary Under-21 A Hurling Championship: 1973, 1974, 1975, 1976

References

External link

 Jim O'Meara player profile

1955 births
Living people
Kilruane MacDonaghs hurlers
Tipperary inter-county hurlers